Linstead Primary & Junior High is an elementary school in Linstead, Jamaica; one of oldest in the island. Despite several official name changes it has always been colloquially known as Linstead School.

The school is attended by students from Linstead and many neighbouring communities. It operates a two shift system in order to accommodate the maximum possible number of students. The first shift is for Grades 1–6, the second for Grades 7–9. Students from 26 neighbouring schools transfer in for grades 7–9. They sit the Junior High School Certificate Examination at Grade 9 prior to transferring to a high school based on their performance in the examination.

The school hosts an Evening Institute for adult education. This is attended by people from a wide area including  Jubilee Town, Cedar Valley, Redwood, Berwick, Bonnet, Jericho, Lluidas Vale, Bermaddy, York Street, and Juan-de-Bolas. It provides courses in barbecue, census enumeration, Jam-Can Group, Peace Corps Group, Training of electorate personnel and CXC classes.

There is an active Parent and Teachers Association, which supports education week and careers day.

The school is a designated earthquake and hurricane shelter.

History
The site is now the Linstead Health Centre on King Street. The room was divided into nine classes using chalkboards as partitions; there were no offices but there were proper toilet facilities, piped water, canteen and head teacher's cottage.

By 1924 there were about 300 students and 9 teachers.

The school's name was changed c. 1946 to Linstead All-Age School and overcrowding became a problem due to the school's popularity.

By the mid 1950s the buildings were becoming dilapidated with the rot in floors and ceilings.

It was officially opened on 1965-01-31 by the Hon. Edwin Allen, Minister of Education.

In the late 1960s an Evening Institute was started for use by adults.

By 1979 there were nearly 2,600 students in buildings designed for 1,250; the number of students was gradually reduced over the following years to a more realistic level.

In 1998 the shift system was introduced to increase the number of students who could be accommodated and the school was reclassified and renamed Linstead Primary and Junior High School with subject teaching in Grades 7–9 now required. In 1999 the school was selected to join the New Horizon Project which aimed to increase the literacy and numeracy levels of primary students.

At the turn of the century the school was receiving financial support from various banks (NCB, JN, RBTT, BNS) and other companies including Cable and Wireless Jamaica Ltd and Nestle Jamaica Ltd.

By September 2003 there were 69 staff and just over 2000 students.

Insignia
The school's motto "Hats off to the past; Coats off for the future" was created by Lester E Smart, then head teacher.
The school emblem was designed by Loretta Morgan, a teacher.
The school magazine is The Genesis.

Principals

Notable alumni
Rattary Lamb

References

Schools in Jamaica
Buildings and structures in Saint Catherine Parish